South Church Street Historic District is a national historic district located at Lewisburg, Greenbrier County, West Virginia.  The district encompasses six contributing buildings, including three single family residences built between 1908 and 1918.  They are representative of the Queen Anne and Bungalow styles.  Each of the houses has a contributing garage on the property.

It was listed on the National Register of Historic Places in 1988.

References

Houses on the National Register of Historic Places in West Virginia
Historic districts in Greenbrier County, West Virginia
Queen Anne architecture in West Virginia
Houses in Greenbrier County, West Virginia
National Register of Historic Places in Greenbrier County, West Virginia
Bungalow architecture in West Virginia
Historic districts on the National Register of Historic Places in West Virginia